Manniang Veng is a town within Churachandpur of Manipur, India. Manniang Veng,  named after the first settler's wife, is a western extension of Zomi Colony. Like Zomi Colony, the new settlement is predominantly inhabited by the Zou community. But unlike Zomi Colony, Manniang Veng is built on an elevated slope on the western margin of Churachandpur (Lamka) town.

Cities and towns in Churachandpur district
Churachandpur